Chris Kelso (born 22 March 1988, Kilmarnock, East Ayrshire, Scotland) is a British Fantasy Award-nominated writer, illustrator, and anthologist from Scotland.

Kelso has also been printed frequently in magazines such as Interzone, Black Static, 3:AM, Locus, and Evergreen Review. He and Garrett Cook are the co-creators of 'The Imperial Youth Review'.

Fiction

 Last Exit To Interzone (Black Dharma Press)
Schadenfreude (Dog Horn Publishing)
A Message from the Slave State (Western Legends Books)
Moosejaw Frontier (Bizarro Pulp Press)
Transmatic (MorbidbookS)
The Black Dog Eats The City (Omnium Gatherum)
Terence, Mephisto and Viscera Eyes (Journalstone) 
The Dissolving Zinc Theatre (Villipede) 
The Folger Variation (Shoreline of Infinity)
Wire & Spittle (Omnium Gatherum) 
Rattled by the Rush (Journalstone)
The Church of Latter Day Eugenics (with Tom Bradley)
I Dream of Mirrors''' (The Sinister Horror Company)The DREGS Trilogy (Black Shuck)
 Voidheads (Schism)

Non-FictionBurroughs and Scotland: Dethroning the Ancients (Beatdom)Interrogating the Abyss (Apocalypse Party)

Anthologies editedCaledonia Dreamin – Strange Fiction of Scottish Descent (by Chris Kelso and Hal Duncan)This is NOT an Anthology (Onieros Books)Slave Stories - Scenes of the Slave State (Omnium Gatherum)I Transgress' (Salo' Press)
Children of the New Flesh: The Early Films and Pervasive Influence of David Cronenberg (11:11)

References

External links
http://www.chris-kelso.com/
https://web.archive.org/web/20131005194705/http://nathanieltower.wordpress.com/2013/06/19/writing-scottish-nonsense-and-librarians-an-interview-with-chris-kelso/
http://bizarrocast.blogspot.co.uk/2012/05/ep5-barjo-and-his-all-american-drugs-by.html
https://locusmag.com/2018/08/sf-in-scotland-by-preston-grassmann-chris-kelso/
https://sensitiveskinmagazine.com/iain-sinclair-hard-to-beat-chris-kelso/

http://tenebrouspress.com/blog/2022/11/22/announcing-the-brave-new-weird-short-list/

Scottish illustrators
Scottish journalists
Scottish male novelists